Vibracathedral Orchestra is an England-based drone ensemble that has been active since 1998.

Biography
The group were formed in Leeds in 1998 when Mick Flower, Neil Campbell and Julian Bradley, who had released a number of homemade cassettes together, joined with Bridget Hayden and Adam Davenport.

Most of the group's earliest recordings, most made by recording live to 2-track, were self-released though many underground labels, including VHF Records, Giardia, Eclipse, U-Sound, Qbico, Textile and Freedom From, have also put out a number of Vibracathedral records. They have twice been featured in session on Resonance FM, given an hour-long slot each time.

Although very much a fixed unit, the line-up has been occasionally augmented by the likes of Matthew Bower, John Godbert, Richard Youngs, John Clyde Evans (latterly known as Tirath Singh Nirmala), and Tom Greenwood (of Jackie-O Motherfucker). Julian Bradley left the group in 2004 with both Neil Campbell and Bridget Hayden following him in 2006. A new album, Wisdom Thunderbolt, featuring Chris Corsano and Matthew Bower as guests, was released on VHF in 2007. The group performed at the Colour Out of Space festival in Brighton in August 2008 with a line-up of Flower, Davenport and Bradley.

According to John F Szwed's biography of Sun Ra, Space is the Place, the original Vibra-Cathedral Orchestra was a 1930s jazz band from Ra's home town of Birmingham, Alabama, which was previously called the Sax-O-Society Orchestra.

Discography
 Mothing CD-R (1998), self-released
 Copse CD-R (1998), self-released
 Falling Free You and Me/Filling Sacks with Coloured Scraps 10-inch (1999), self-released
 The Vibracathedral String Quartet CD-R (1999), self-released
 Music for Red Breath CD-R (2000), self-released
 Vibracathedral String Band / Vibracathedral Drum Troupe 7-inch (2000), Freedom From
 Lino Hi CD (2000), Giardia
 Hollin CD-R (2000), self-released
 Versatile Arab Chord Chart CD (2001), VHF
 Long Live the Weeds CD-R (2001), self-released
 Their Spines Crumble for a Hug cassette (2001), self-released
 My Gate's Open, Tremble by My Side (2001), Roaratorio
 Hot Booty CD-R (2001), VHF
 Live in Newcastle and Leeds 1999 cassette (2001), Matching Head Tapes
 The One You Call the Ghost Train 7-inch (2001), Tonschact
 Dabbling with Gravity and Who You Are (2002), VHF
 Wearing Clothes of Ash / Baptism Bar Blues split with Jackie-O Motherfucker (2002), Textile
 split with Low (2002), Misplaced Music
 MMICD CD-R (2003), self-released
 Girls with Rocks in Their Hands 7-inch (2003), Great Pop Supplement
 Rain Gutter Teasing Rusty Cat Sneezing split 7-inch with Phonophani (2003), Safe as Milk
 Hex Hostess CD-R (2003), self-released
 Wings over America split with Sunroof! (2003), VHF
 The Queen of Guess (2003), VHF
 U-Sound volume 13: Live in Manchester/Leeds CD-R (2003), U-Sound
 Ragged and Right CD-R (2003), self-released
 Royal Park / Brudenell 7-inch (2003), Gold Soundz
 untitled double LP (2004), self-released
 Live on WFMU (2004), Eclipse
 Pontiac Lady triple CD-R (2004), VHF
 Resonance Session CDR (self-released 2005)
 Qbico U-Night 2LP, 2 sides by VCO (Qbico 2005)
 Øyenstikker utbrudd CD-R (2005) self-released
 Live at Audioscope '04 split 10-inch with The Telescopes (2005), Fourier Transform
 Smash! Smash! Smash! CD-R (2005), self-released
 Tuning to the Rooster CD (2005), Important
 Saved by the Bird CD-R (2005), self-released
 VCO @ ATP 2004 CD-R (2006), Spirit of Orr
 The Sun Balance / The Open Knot (2007), Qbico
 Wisdom Thunderbolt (2007), VHF
 Get it? / Baptised By Intuition, split 7-inch with Infinite Light (2009), Krayon Recordings
 The Momentary Aviary LP (2009), Manhand
 Joka Baya LP (2010), VHF
 The Secret Base LP (2010), VHF
 Smoke Song LP (2010), VHF
 untitled split CD-R w. Death Shanties (2015), self-released

References

External links
Official MySpace

English experimental musical groups
Musical groups established in 1998
Musical groups from Leeds
Drone music groups